The 2008 season was the 103rd season of competitive football in Norway.

Men's football

League season

Promotion and relegation

Tippeligaen

1. divisjon

2. divisjon

3. divisjon

Norwegian Cup

Final

Women's football

League season

Promotion and relegation

Toppserien

1. divisjon

Norwegian Women's Cup

Final
 Røa 3–1 Team Strømmen

Men's UEFA competitions

Champions League

Qualifying rounds

Second qualifying round

|}

Third qualifying round

|}

UEFA Cup

Qualifying rounds

First qualifying round

|}

Second qualifying round

|}

First round

|}

Group stage

Group G

Intertoto Cup

Second round

|}

Third round

|}

Winners
The 11 co-winners were:

  Braga (Overall winners) (round of 16, lost to Paris Saint-Germain)
  Aston Villa (round of 32, lost to CSKA Moscow)
  Deportivo La Coruña (round of 32, lost to AaB)
  Stuttgart (round of 32, lost to Zenit Saint Petersburg)
  Rosenborg (Group stage, fifth in Group G)
  Napoli (First round, lost to Benfica)
  Rennes (First round, lost to Twente)
  Vaslui (First round, lost to Slavia Prague)
  Elfsborg (Second qualifying round, lost to St Patrick's Athletic)
  Grasshopper Zürich (Second qualifying round, lost to Lech Poznań)
  Sturm Graz (Second qualifying round, lost to Zürich)

UEFA Women's Cup

First qualifying round

Group A4

Matches (played in Oslo, Norway)
 Røa 2–0 Honka Espoo
 Honka Espoo 6–0 NSA Sofia
 NSA Sofia 0–7 Røa

Second qualifying round

Group B1

Matches (played in Oslo, Norway)
 Glasgow City 1–6 Røa
 1. FFC Frankfurt 3–1 Røa
 Røa 1–3 Zvezda 2005 Perm

National teams

Norway men's national football team

2010 FIFA World Cup qualification (UEFA)

Group 9

Fixtures and results

Key
 H = Home match
 A = Away match
 N = Neutral ground

Norway women's national football team

Notes and references

 
Seasons in Norwegian football